Graciela "Chaco" Navarro (born 26 December 1958) is an Argentine politician, currently serving as National Deputy elected in Santiago del Estero since 2011. A member of the Civic Front for Santiago (FCpS), she has sat in the Frente de Todos parliamentary bloc since 2019.

Early life and career
Navarro was born on 26 December 1958 in Monte Quemado, a city in Northern Santiago del Estero Province. Her political career began in the Radical Civic Union (UCR): she served as a member of the party's Santiago del Estero Provincial Committee from 2011 to 2005, and as secretary of the committee from 1997 to 2011.

Navarro's first political post was as a member of the city council of Santiago del Estero, in 2001. She was re-elected for a second two-year term in 2003. In 2009, she was elected to the provincial Chamber of Deputies.

Congresswoman

In the 2011 election to the National Chamber of Deputies, Navarro was the first alternate candidate in the Civic Front for Santiago list, which received 71.03% of the vote and elected all four seats up for grabs. Jorge Raúl Pérez, the third candidate in the list, died shortly before the new Congress was due to take office, on 11 November 2011. As alternate candidate, Navarro took office in his stead.

In the 2015 election, Navarro ran for re-election as the third candidate in the Civic Front list. The FCpS received 65.67% of the vote, and Navarro was elected. She was re-elected for a third term in 2019 as the second candidate in the FCpS list, which received 56.66% of the vote. Following the 2019 election, Navarro and the other FCpS deputies formed part of the Frente de Todos parliamentary bloc in the Chamber.

During her 2019–2023 term, Navarro formed part of the parliamentary commissions on Culture, Budget and Finances, Economy, Population and Human Development, and Sports. She was an opponent of the legalisation of abortion in Argentina, voting against the Voluntary Interruption of Pregnancy bills debated by the Argentine Congress in 2018 and 2020, the latter of which eventually passed and went on to legalise abortion in 2021.

Personal life
Navarro suffered from throat cancer and underwent surgery in 2017 after it metastasised to her brain. In 2018, during a visit to General Roca, Río Negro for a mass in honour of Ceferino Namuncurá, Navarro suffered a stroke and fell into a brief coma. In 2020, she contracted COVID-19, but recovered satisfactorily.

Navarro is Roman Catholic, and a devotee of Ceferino Namuncurá. She is married to Jaime Sesse.

References

External links

Profile on the official website of the Chamber of Deputies (in Spanish)

Living people
1958 births
Members of the Argentine Chamber of Deputies elected in Santiago del Estero
Women members of the Argentine Chamber of Deputies
Members of the Chamber of Deputies of Santiago del Estero
People from Santiago del Estero Province
Radical Civic Union politicians
Argentine Roman Catholics
21st-century Argentine politicians
21st-century Argentine women politicians